L-aminoadipate-semialdehyde dehydrogenase-phosphopantetheinyl transferase is an enzyme that in humans is encoded by the AASDHPPT gene.

The protein encoded by this gene is similar to Saccharomyces cerevisiae LYS5, which is required for the activation of the alpha-aminoadipate dehydrogenase in the biosynthetic pathway of lysine. Yeast alpha-aminoadipate dehydrogenase converts alpha-biosynthetic-aminoadipate semialdehyde to alpha-aminoadipate. It has been suggested that defects in the human gene result in pipecolic acidemia.

References

Further reading

External links